Beyond the Mist may refer to:
Beyond the Mist (Lotte Anker album)
Beyond the Mist (Robin Trower album)